The Rufaro Stadium is a multi-purpose stadium in Harare, Zimbabwe and home to Dynamos F.C. and Harare City F.C. It is currently used mostly for football matches. The stadium has a capacity of 60,000  people.

In 1980, Bob Marley and the Wailers, performed at Rufaro Stadium to celebrate Zimbabwe's newly-achieved independence its ending of a white-majority rule. The stadium hosted Paul Simon for the televised concert at the height of his Graceland tour, where he was joined by Hugh Masekela, Miriam Makeba and Ladysmith Black Mambazo.

FIFA, through its GOAL programme, has sponsored the renovation of the natural grass pitch into an artificial football pitch.  This synthetic turf pitch, called Xtreme Turf, has been manufactured and installed by Act Global. The artificial turf was however removed at the end of the 2016 football season due to its deteriorating state. A natural turf has since been installed and the stadium was reopened for use in April 2017.

References

Football venues in Zimbabwe
Sport in Harare
Buildings and structures in Harare
Stadiums in Zimbabwe
Multi-purpose stadiums in Zimbabwe
Dynamos F.C.